Henry Jodrell (bapt. 30 May 1750 – 11 March 1814) was an English barrister and Member of Parliament.

He was a younger son of Paul Jodrell of Duffield, Derbyshire, the Solicitor-General to Frederick, Prince of Wales, and his wife, Elizabeth. Richard Paul Jodrell, (1745 – 1831), classical scholar and playwright, and Sir Paul Jodrell (died 1803), physician to the Nabob of Arcot, were his elder brothers. He was educated at Eton school and Lincoln's Inn, where he was called to the bar in 1773, and inherited Bayfield Hall, near the north Norfolk coast, from his mother.

He was Commissioner of Bankrupts 1783-97 and the Recorder of Great Yarmouth 1792–1813. He resigned the recordership in 1813 to avoid having to pass the death sentence on his wife's murderer.

He was MP for Great Yarmouth from 1796 to 1802, and MP for Bramber, Sussex from 1802 to 1812.

He is buried in Letheringsett with a memorial designed by John Bacon.

He married Johanna Elizabeth, daughter of John Weyland of Woodeaton, Oxfordshire. They had no children.

References

|-

|-

1750 births
1814 deaths
People from Duffield
People educated at Eton College
Members of Lincoln's Inn
Members of the Parliament of Great Britain for English constituencies
British MPs 1796–1800
Members of the Parliament of the United Kingdom for English constituencies
UK MPs 1801–1802
UK MPs 1802–1806
UK MPs 1806–1807
UK MPs 1807–1812
Politics of the Borough of Great Yarmouth
English barristers